Lonsdale is a British sports equipment, textile and footwear brand focused on boxing and mixed martial arts established in London in 1960. Former boxer Bernard Hart started the brand as a boxing equipment company, but it eventually branched out into clothing as well. The company is named after Hugh Lowther, 5th Earl of Lonsdale, who in 1891 set up the first organised boxing matches with gloves, following the deaths of three boxers in bare-knuckle fights.  the Lonsdale brand is owned and operated by Sports Direct owner the Frasers Group (formerly "Sports Direct International").

Products commercialised by Lonsdale include gloves, shorts, headguards, shin guards, hand wraps, jockstraps, punching bags, sneakers and boxing boots. The clothing line is composed of t-shirts, hoodies, jackets, leggings, shorts and underwear.

History 
In 1959, former professional welterweight boxer Bernard Hart was granted permission to use the Lonsdale name by James Lowther, 7th Earl of Lonsdale. In 1960, business commenced for the brand at 21 Beak St., Soho, London.

Lonsdale became ingrained into 1960s popular fashion due to its location near Carnaby Street. Celebrities who publicly wore the brand included Paul McCartney, Gregory Peck, Anthony Quinn and Tony Curtis. In 1979, mod revival icon Paul Weller visited the store and bought Lonsdale T-shirts to wear on a tour of Japan, which led to an increase in sales for the brand in both the UK and Asia.

In the 1990s, Lonsdale expanded to new markets in Europe, and by 1998, the brand had expanded to Australia. In 2002 it was acquired by Sports Direct.

During the 2005–06 English football season, Lonsdale was the kit provider for Blackburn Rovers Football Club. In 2006, Lonsdale stores opened in Singapore, Taiwan and other parts of Asia. , a division of Lonsdale produces football kits for Brentford, Swindon Town and Millwall.

On 25 March 2010, Lonsdale celebrated the 50th anniversary of the brand by holding the Lonsdale Challenge at the Liberty Boxing Gym in Nottingham, England. The event featured Lonsdale-sponsored boxers Carl Froch, James DeGale and Tony Jeffries in various boxing-related challenges.

Mixed martial arts promotion BAMMA announced during mid July 2012, that they had renewed their partnership deal with Lonsdale as they move to Channel 5 in September.

Notable fighters
The following fighters have worn Lonsdale clothing during bouts:

  Carl Froch
  David Price
  Lennox Lewis
  Henry Cooper
  James DeGale
  Audley Harrison
  Ricky Hatton
  Tony Jeffries
  Brian London
  Ryan Rhodes
  Sugar Ray Robinson
  Muhammad Ali
  Joe Calzaghe

Controversy 
In the early 2000s, the brand became popular among some European neo-Nazis, allegedly because a carefully placed outer jacket leaves only the letters NSDA showing; one letter short of NSDAP, the initials of the Nationalsozialistische Deutsche Arbeiterpartei—the Nazi Party. Wearing a brand with no Nazi links to express Nazi sympathies helped bypass strict laws concerning the public display of Nazi symbolism. In the Netherlands, Belgium, northern France, Spain and Germany, the term Lonsdale youth became widely used to describe teenagers with far right tendencies, and the brand was banned from certain schools in the Netherlands and Germany.

Lonsdale reacted to this trend by sponsoring anti-racist events and campaigns, and by refusing to deliver products to known neo-Nazi retailers. In 2003, the "Lonsdale Loves All Colours" campaign was launched, emphasising non-white fashion models, along with increased support for initiatives that combat racism.

See also
 Lonsdale Belt
 Mixed martial arts clothing
 FujiGen

References

External links
 
 Hollywood leather jackets
 SWO jackets

Sporting goods manufacturers of the United Kingdom
Companies based in Derbyshire
Clothing companies established in 1960
1960 establishments in England
Clothing brands of the United Kingdom
Sportswear brands
Sports Direct
2002 mergers and acquisitions